Empress-Theater may refer to:

Australia
Empress Theatre (Victoria) in Prahran, Victoria, which was destroyed by fire in June 1971

Canada
Empress Theatre (Montreal) (also known as Cinema V) in Montreal, Quebec, Canada
Empress Theatre (Vancouver), a 1908 theater at Gore and Hastings in Chinatown, Vancouver until demolished in 1940
Empress Theatre (Fort Macleod), 1912 two-storey brick-theater in Fort Macleod, Alberta

New Zealand
Empress Theatre (Wellington), former theater in the Te Aro area of Wellington, replaced by the Majestic Cinema which was itself demolished in 1925

United Kingdom
Empress Theatre (Brixton) 1898 theater in Brixton designed by Wylson & Long built by W. H. Burney and W. J. Grimes
Empress Theatre (Glasgow) one of the former names of The Metropole Theater in Glasgow's west end
Empress Theatre (Partick), a 1900 theater in Partick designed by H & D Barclay
Empress Theatre (Whitley Bay) an 1800 seater theater at Spanish City, Whitley Bay
The 2 storey, 6000 seater theater at the Empire of India Exhibition

United States
Empress Theatre (California) in Vallejo, California, United States
Empress Theatre (Magna, Utah) a 1916 neo-classical theater
Former name of the Crest Theatre in Sacramento, California